Melinting  is one of the traditional Lampungese dances originating from the Lampung province, Indonesia. The Melinting dance was originally called the Cetik Kipas dance. The name was later replaced with the Melinting dance which refers to the origin of this dance, namely the Melinting area. The name change was at the suggestion of President Sukarno who asked the Central Lampung Regional Government to perform the dance at Istora Senayan Jakarta on August 17, 1965. Melinting is a dance inherited from Ratu Melinting which is estimated to have existed in the sixteenth century. This dance is performed at traditional events when welcoming guests, and the dancers are members of the Queen's family or Melinting nobles. This dance was danced outside a traditional event for the first time in 1930 in Teluk Betung at the invitation of the Resident of Lampung to Pesirah Marga in Lampung.

History

The Melinting dance originates from Lampung, and is thought to have developed since Islam gained a large following in Indonesia. However, this dance is not widely known even from the people of Lampung itself.

This dance is one of the relics of the Melinting Kingdom which was created by Ratu Melinting II in the 16th century. This dance has a meaning to show how people are grateful for the happiness they have received. In addition, this dance also illustrates the might and majesty of Ratu Meliting in leading the kingdom at that time. Before undergoing a refinement change in 1958, the Melinting Lampung dance was absolutely owned by the royal family of the Queen Melinting Family.

Performance

Form and Movement

The movements in dancing are divided into two based on gender, namely male and female. This dance is usually danced by women and men with a total of 8 dancers consisting of 4 men and 4 women. When dancing, the dancers will be divided into several rounds, namely the opening round (Pembuka), the kugowo queen round, the floating kenui round, and the closing round (Penutup).

Outfit
Islam makes a contribution that affects how the dance properties are. The Melinting dance costume for men consists of tapis cloth, belanga shirt, seretei feathers (Bulu seretei), a fan with free colors, and gold Skullcap

Meanwhile, the Melinting dance properties for women consist of tapis pepadun, long-sleeved white kebaya shirt, bun, singer rolling a yellow veil, jukum fruit, fan with free colors and ruwi bracelet. In addition to property, make-up is very important for Melinting dancers to create the right dancer's face, make-up will have an influence on how the atmosphere is right for dancing the dance.

Music
Melinting dance uses various musical accompaniments typical of the people of Lampung, one of which is Kalo Bala. Besides Kalo Bala, the accompaniment of this dance also often uses kendang, gongs, gamelan, fiddle, and various other musical instruments.

The purpose of the musical accompaniment in the Melinting dance is:
 Opening dance
 Accompanying the dancers into the performance arena
 As a sign of respect for the guests present

See also

 Gending Sriwijaya
 Dance in Indonesia

References

Dances of Indonesia